The United States Air Force's 75th Expeditionary Air Support Operations Squadron (75 EASOS) is a combat support unit providing Tactical Command and Control of air power assets to the Joint Forces Air Component Commander and Joint Forces Land Component Commander for combat operations.

Previous designations
75th Expeditionary Air Support Operations Squadron (12 Feb 2009 – present)
75th Tactical Control Flight (1 Feb 1972 – 1 Jul 1983)

Assignments

Major Command
Air Combat Command (12 Feb 2009 – present)
Tactical Air Command (1 Feb 1972 – 1 Jul 1983)

Wings/Groups
507th Tactical Control Wing (1 Feb 1972 – 1 Jul 1983)

Bases stationed
Eglin AFB Aux Fld # 3, Florida (1 Feb 1972 – 1 Jul 1983)

Decorations
Air Force Outstanding Unit Award 
1 May 1981 – 30 Apr 1983
16 Jun 1975 – 31 May 1977
16 Jun 1974 – 15 Jun 1975

References

External links
 Globalsecurity.org: 75th Air Support Operations Squadron

Expeditionary Air Support Operations 0075